On 18 September 2022, protests in Moldova began in the capital city of Chișinău, demanding the resignation of the country's pro-Western government, amid an energy crisis causing rising natural gas prices and inflation, caused in part by the war in Ukraine.

The protests have been organised by the pro-Russian Șor Party. The party has been offering cash payments to people to attend the protests and has also been providing free transportation to the capital for protest attendees, with funds provided by Ilan Shor, the oligarch and leader of the Șor Party who had fled Moldova amid corruption charges.

Timeline

2022

September
 On 18 September, about 20,000 people attended a protest in Chișinău, demanding that the country's pro-Western government resign.

October
 On 13 October, the authorities of the Republic of Moldova decided to ban rallies that block traffic lanes, transport arteries or access roads to public institutions during the week, these being allowed only on weekends for a maximum duration of four hours.
 On 14 October, several people came out to protest in the center of the capital against the measure taken by the authorities, and at least 4 people were detained.
 On 18 October, the Russian National Liberation Movement launched a campaign in Gagauzia to "recognize as illegal the dissolution of the Soviet Union and the restoration of the borders of the former Soviet Union in accordance with the results of World War II".
 On 26 October 2022, Ilan Shor and Vladimir Plahotniuc were sanctioned by the United States Department of the Treasury over their association with the Russian government.

November
 On 6 November, over 50,000 supporters of the Șor party took part in a protest in the national capital of Chișinău, once again demanding the resignation of the pro-western government and snap parliamentary elections.
 On 8 November, the Moldovan government announced that it had requested the constitutional court to initiate proceedings for the outlawing of Ilan Shor's "Șor" party in Moldova, due to it allegedly promoting the interests of a foreign state and harming national independence and sovereignty.
 On 13 November, thousands of anti-government protesters returned to the streets of Chișinău.

December
On 7 December, Ilan Shor asked President Maia Sandu to nominate him as Prime Minister of Moldova.
On 11 December, a new anti-government protest took place in Chișinău, this initiated by the We Build Europe at Home Party (PACE).
On 15 December, within the Orheileaks investigation, the links between the Șor protesters and the unionist activist Vlad Bilețchi were exposed. The latter denied any association with protesters.
On 18 December, the Party of Socialists of the Republic of Moldova (PSRM) organized a protest in Ungheni.
On 19 December, six TV channels in Moldova linked to Ilan Shor (Prime TV, RTR Moldova, Accent TV, NTV Moldova, TV6 and Orhei TV) were temporarily suspended, on charges of making pro-Russian propaganda and spreading false information about the Russian-Ukrainian war. The channels continued streaming on other platforms.

2023

January
On 25 January, several journalists from suspended TV channels, led by Alexei Lungu, protested in Bucharest, demanding the intervention of the Romanian authorities to negotiate with the Moldovan ones to restart broadcasting the channels on TV. The next day, on 26 January, the journalists protested at the Council of Europe in Strasbourg. On the same day, Russian deputies Leonid Kalashnikov and Svetlana Zhurova warned that Moldova's intentions to unite with Romania, and thus joining NATO, may lead to its destruction.
On 26 January, several hundred pensioners from among supporters of the Șor Party protested on Thursday at the presidential building, demanding the resignation of Sandu.

February
 On 2 February, Russian foreign minister Sergey Lavrov declared that Moldova might have Ukraine's fate (meaning to be attacked by Russia) if the Moldovan president Maia Sandu, who has Romanian citizenship, wants Moldova to unite with Romania and join NATO.
 On 9 February, the Ukrainian president Volodymyr Zelenskyy declared in the European Parliament that the Ukrainian secret services discovered a plan to overthrow the current Moldovan leadership and replace it with a pro-Russian one. He also declared that these plans have been sent to the Moldovan government. Russia denied any allegations.
 On 10 February, the government of the Republic of Moldova resigned due to the ongoing crisis.
 On 13 February, Maia Sandu announced a violent plan of Russia, with terrorist attacks and hostage-taking, to overthrow the PAS-led government. Irina Vlah, governor of Gagauzia, claimed that "Sandu makes excuses to turn Moldova into a police state".
On 16 February, a new cabinet led by Dorin Recean was sowrn in. The new Prime-minister declared that Moldova's neutrality won't protect the country from any military aggresion.
On 19 February, thousands of pro-Russian protesters took part in a protest in the national capital of Chișinău, once again demanding the resignation of the pro-western government. Despite the fact that Marina Tauber, the leader of the protesters, denied any link with the Russian authorities, some protesters requested a Russian military intervention in Moldova and its accesion into Russia. Ukrainian politician Mykhailo Podolyak claimed that Russia is trying to organise a coup d'etat in Moldova. Several other people organised a counter-protest, marching with Romanian and NATO flags. On the same day, Moldovan Prime-minister Dorin Recean demanded an end to the Russian military presence in Transnistria and a peaceful reunification of Moldova and Transnistria. Dmitry Peskov, the press secretary of the Russian president Vladimir Putin, claimed that Moldova's rulers are provoking Anti-Russian hysteria. Russian deputy Sergey Mironov, leader of A Just Russia — For Truth, who has close relations with the Moldovan socialists, threatened with a Russian military attack if Moldova enters Transnistria; he also claimed that Transnistria's accesion to Moldova is a dream of Moldo-Romanian nationalists.
On 21 February, Russian president Vladimir Putin revoked the decree that underpinned Moldova's sovereignty in resolving the Transnistria conflict. On the same day, Prime-minister Dorin Recean declared that Russia tried to take the Chișinău Airport under its control, in order to bring Russian and pro-Russian diversionists to overthrow the Moldovan government.
On 27 February, Wizz Air announced that it will suspend all flights to and from Chișinău Airport, due to security concerns linked to rising tensions with Russia. Most of the routes will be relocated to the Iași Airport in Romania.

March
On 2 March, the Moldovan parliament voted the change of the state language from Moldovan to Romanian. The idea was supported by the ruling Party of Action and Solidarity and was strongly opposed by the Bloc of Communists and Socialists. The Academy of Sciences of Moldova also supported this decision. On the same day, the Moldovan Parliament adopted a resolution condemning the 2022 Russian invasion of Ukraine. Maria Zakharova, the Spokeswoman for the Ministry of Foreign Affairs of Russia, warned Moldova to give up the "anti-Russian rhetoric". The bill was approved on its second and final reading on 16 March.
On 6 March, the Bloc of Communists and Socialists organized a protest in front of the Constitutional Court of Moldova against changing the name of the official language from Moldovan to Romanian. PAS leaders claimed that they are backed by Russia. There was also a counter-protest, in support of the Romanian language.

Reactions
 : On 10 March 2023, the Russian Minister of Foreign Affairs Sergey Lavrov accused the West of having double standards because it supports the anti-government protests in Georgia but condemns those in the Republic of Moldova.

See also
 Economic impact of the 2022 Russian invasion of Ukraine

References

2022 in Moldova
2022 protests
2023 in Moldova
2023 protests
Protests in Moldova
Riots and civil disorder in Moldova
Moldova–Russia relations
Reactions to the 2022 Russian invasion of Ukraine